Shantha Sisira Kumara Abeysekara as known as "Shantha Abeysekara" is a Sri Lankan politician and a member of the Parliament of Sri Lanka. He was elected from Puttalam District in 2015. He is a Member of the United National Party.

He was elected from the electorate of  Chilaw of Puttalam District in August  2015. Also, he is a former Member of North Western Provincial Council  and, has had been elected thrice in a row.

References

Living people
Members of the 15th Parliament of Sri Lanka
Year of birth missing (living people)